Mount Mimongo (locally known as Mt Songo), with an elevation of , is one of the higher mountains in the Chaillu Mountain Range in Gabon. The summit is situated 20 km east of the small town of Mimongo and within a few hours walk from the village Dibandi. The region was first explored by Paul Du Chaillu between 1855 and 1865.

Flora
Pararistolochia incisiloba (Jongkind) M.E. Leal (Aristolochiaceae) is a  plant species endemic to Mt Mimongo and also the only location on mainland Africa where Begonia thomeana C.DC. (Begoniaceae) is found, previously endemic to Sao Tome.

References
Britannica 
https://web.archive.org/web/20160304050730/http://carpe.umd.edu/Documents/2008/The_biodiversity_of_Bouvala_NV_Gabon_TStevart_MELeal_Jul2008.pdf
http://www.tropicos.org/NamePage.aspx?nameid=50226646&tab=specimens

Mountains of Gabon